The Laxapana Dam is a gravity dam built across the Maskeliya Oya,  downstream of the Laxapana Falls, in the Central Province of Sri Lanka.

Power station and reservoir 
The dam creates the Laxapana Reservoir, which is sustained from water flowing in from the Kelani River, and discharged water from the Old Laxapana Hydroelectric Power Stations and New Laxapana Hydroelectric Power Stations. The Old Laxapana and New Laxapana hydroelectric power stations belongs to the Norton Dam and Canyon Dam respectively, delivered via penstocks.

See also 
 List of dams and reservoirs in Sri Lanka
 List of power stations in Sri Lanka

References 

1969 establishments in Ceylon
Buildings and structures in Nuwara Eliya District
Dams completed in 1969
Dams in Sri Lanka
Gravity dams
Hydroelectric power stations in Sri Lanka